Derren John Charles Witcombe (born 30 October 1978) is an Australian-born New Zealand rugby union coach and former player. As a player, he played at hooker.

He played for the All Blacks in 2005 and at Super Rugby level for the Blues between 2002 and 2007. He represented Northland and then Auckland at provincial level.

Witcombe retired from playing in 2007 due to a neck injury. He took up coaching and was appointed head coach of Northland in the 2013 and 2014 National Provincial Championships. He departed suddenly in early 2015 to take up a position at Japanese club Mitsubishi Sagamihara DynaBoars.

In February 2017, Witcombe signed a contract to return to the Northland province as head coach for the 2017 Mitre 10 Cup.

Witcombe grew up on a dry stock farm in Taupo Bay before attending high school in Whangarei, where he pursued both Rugby and Cricket. He played Cricket for the Northland province as a wicket keeper/batsman.

He went on to work in forestry for four years, playing both Rugby and Cricket at club level, making his debut for Northland in 2001.

Notes and references

External links 
 

1978 births
Living people
Australian emigrants to New Zealand
Rugby union hookers
Blues (Super Rugby) players
Northland rugby union players
Auckland rugby union players
New Zealand rugby union players
New Zealand international rugby union players
Rugby union players from Hobart